Flephedrone, also known as 4-fluoromethcathinone (4-FMC), is a stimulant drug of the cathinone chemical class that has been sold online as a designer drug starting in 2008.

Toxicity 
Flephedrone has only a short history of human use and its toxicity is not well established.

Legality 

Flephedrone has been illegal in Denmark since December 2008.

Flephedrone has been illegal in the UK since April 2010. Flephedrone has been illegal in the Lithuania since April 2010. Flephedrone is  illegal in Brazil since 2017 as an analogue or derivative of cathinone. Flephedrone is most likely illegal in Australia as an analogue or derivative of cathinone.

Flephedrone has been illegal in Poland since April 2010.

Flephedrone has been classed as a narcotic in Sweden since October 2010.

In the United States, flephedrone is temporarily listed as a Schedule I controlled substance.  It is permanently listed as a Schedule I controlled substance in Florida, Georgia, and Pennsylvania.

As of October 2015 4-FMC is a controlled substance in China.

See also 
 3-Fluoromethcathinone (3-FMC)

References 

Cathinones
Fluoroarenes
Designer drugs
Serotonin-norepinephrine-dopamine releasing agents
Entactogens and empathogens